CW2 may refer to any of the following:

Places
 CW2, a postcode district in the CW postcode area

People
 Chief Warrant Officer 2, a rank of Warrant Officer (United States) in the United States military

Television stations in the United States affiliated with The CW
 List of The CW affiliates (by U.S. state)

Current
 KATN-DT3 in Fairbanks, Alaska
 KBOI-DT2 in Boise, Idaho
 Simulcast of local sister station KYUU-LD
 KHON-DT2 in Honolulu, Hawaii
 KTVQ-DT2 in Billings, Montana
 KWGN-TV in Denver, Colorado
 KXMA-TV in Dickinson, North Dakota
 WCBD-DT2 in Charleston, South Carolina
 WKTV-DT3 in Utica, New York

Former
 KCWX in Fredericksburg / San Antonio, Texas  (CW affiliated from 2006 to 2010)

Software
 Creeper World 2, a computer game developed by Knuckle Cracker
 Creative Writer 2 software by Microsoft Kids

Other uses
 Cw2 (cee double-u two) is a common misinterpretation of Cvv2 (cee vee vee two, for card verification value 2), a type of Card Security Code of credit and debit cards
 Cold War II

See also

 
 
 Cwcw (film), a 2008 Welsh film, see List of Welsh films
 C2W
 CW (disambiguation)
 CWW (disambiguation)
 C (disambiguation)
 W (disambiguation)